George William Booker (December 5, 1821 – June 4, 1883) was a nineteenth-century politician, lawyer, teacher, judge and justice of the peace from Virginia.

Biography
Born near Stuart, Virginia, Booker attended common schools as a child, taught school, studied law and was admitted to the bar in 1846, commencing practice in Patrick County, Virginia. He was elected a justice of the peace in Henry County, Virginia and was a member and presiding judge of the county court from 1856 to 1868. Booker was a member of the Virginia House of Delegates from 1866 to 1867 and was elected Attorney General of Virginia in 1868, serving until 1869. He was elected a Conservative to the United States House of Representatives in 1869, serving from 1870 to 1871 and afterwards resumed practicing law in Martinsville, Virginia. Booker died in Martinsville on June 4, 1883 and was interred there in the family cemetery.

Notes

External links

George Booker at The Political Graveyard

1821 births
1883 deaths
Republican Party members of the Virginia House of Delegates
Republican Party members of the United States House of Representatives from Virginia
Virginia lawyers
Virginia state court judges
Virginia Attorneys General
Conservative Party of Virginia politicians
Conservative Party of Virginia members of the United States House of Representatives
19th-century American politicians
19th-century American lawyers
19th-century American judges
People from Stuart, Virginia
People from Henry County, Virginia
Burials in Virginia
People from Martinsville, Virginia